D105 is a state road on Rab Island in Croatia connecting the town of Rab to Mišnjak ferry ports, from where Rapska Plovidba ferries fly to the mainland, docking in Jablanac and the D405 state road and to Lopar ferry port from where Jadrolinija ferries fly to Valbiska, Krk and the D104.

The road, as well as all other state roads in Croatia, is managed and maintained by Hrvatske ceste, a state-owned company.

Traffic volume 

Traffic is regularly counted and reported by Hrvatske ceste (HC), operator of the road. Substantial variations between annual (AADT) and summer (ASDT) traffic volumes are attributed to the fact that the road connects a number of island resorts.

Road junctions and populated areas

Sources

See also
 Hrvatske ceste

External links
 Linijska Nacionalna Plovidba d.d.
 Rapska Plovidba

State roads in Croatia
Transport in Primorje-Gorski Kotar County
Rab